Cunoniaceae is a family of 27 genera and about 335 species of woody plants in the order Oxalidales, mostly found in the tropical and wet temperate regions of the Southern Hemisphere.
The greatest diversity of genera are in Australia and Tasmania (15 genera), New Guinea (9 genera), and New Caledonia (7 genera). The family is also present in  Central America, South America, the Caribbean, Malesia, the islands of the South Pacific, Madagascar and surrounding islands. the family is absent from mainland Asia except from Peninsular Malaysia, and almost absent from mainland Africa apart from two species from Southern Africa (Cunonia capensis, Platylophus trifoliatus). Several of the genera have remarkable disjunct ranges, found on more than one continent, e.g. Cunonia (Southern Africa & New Caledonia), Eucryphia (Australia & South America) Weinmannia (America and the Mascarenes).

The family includes trees and shrubs; most are evergreen but a few are deciduous. The leaves are opposite or whorled (alternate in Davidsonia), and simple or compound (pinnate or palmate), with entire or toothed margin, and often with conspicuous stipules (interpetiolar or intrapetiolar). The flowers have four or five (rarely three or up to ten) sepals and petals. The fruit is usually a woody capsule or a follicle containing several small seeds.

The family has a rich fossil record in Australia and fossil representatives are known in the Northern Hemisphere. Platydiscus peltatus was found in Upper Cretaceous rocks from Sweden and is likely a member of the Cunoniaceae. An earlier possible fossil member is from the Cenomanian. Tropidogyne, found in Burmese amber, has flowers that strongly resemble the extant Ceratopetalum.

Taxonomy
The genera of the family have been divided into tribes.
Tribe Spiraeanthemeae
 Spiraeanthemum 

Tribe Schizomerieae
 Anodopetalum 
 Ceratopetalum 
 Schizomeria 
 Platylophus 

Tribe Geissoieae
 Geissois 
 Karrabina 
 Lamanonia 
 Pseudoweinmannia 

Tribe Caldcluvieae
 Ackama 
 Caldcluvia 
 Opocunonia 

Tribe Codieae
 Callicoma 
 Codia 
 Pullea 

Tribe Cunonieae
 Cunonia 
 Pancheria 
 Pterophylla 
 Vesselowskya 
 Weinmannia 

Unplaced to tribe
 Acrophyllum 
 Aistopetalum 
 Bauera 
 Davidsonia 
 Eucryphia 
 Hooglandia 
 Gillbeea

References

 
Rosid families
Santonian first appearances
Taxa named by Robert Brown (botanist, born 1773)
Extant Santonian first appearances